As of 2013, there were 86 , 90 public universities and 606 private universities in Japan. National universities tend to be held in higher regard in higher education in Japan than private or public universities.

As of the 2019 fiscal year, the number of national universities, 86, is unchanged, while the number of public universities increased to 93 and private universities increased to 607 compared with 2013.

History
In 2004, the national university system underwent partial privatization. Faculty and staff are no longer  working for the Ministry of Education, Culture, Sports, Science and Technology.

Designated National Universities 
In April 2017, an amendment to the National University Corporation Act enabled the classification of national university corporations  as  “Designated National University Corporations”, with the stated aims of significantly improving the education and research levels of Japanese universities. As of 2021 a total of 10 national universities have been thus selected by the MEXT.
 Hitotsubashi University (former Tokyo College of Commerce)
 Kyoto University (former Kyoto Imperial University)
 Nagoya University (former Nagoya Imperial University)
 Osaka University (former Osaka Imperial University)
 Tohoku University (former Tohoku Imperial University)
 Tokyo Institute of Technology
 Tokyo Medical and Dental University
 The University of Tokyo (former Tokyo Imperial University)
 University of Tsukuba
 Kyushu University (former Kyushu Imperial University)

National universities 
 Aichi University of Education
 Akita University
 Asahikawa Medical University
 Chiba University
 Ehime University
 Fukuoka University of Education
 Fukushima University
 Gifu University
 The Graduate University for Advanced Studies (SOKENDAI)
 Gunma University
 Hamamatsu University School of Medicine
 Hirosaki University
 Hiroshima University
 Hokkaido University (former Hokkaido Imperial University)
 Hokkaido University of Education
 Hyogo University of Teacher Education
 Ibaraki University
 Iwate University
 Japan Advanced Institute of Science and Technology (JAIST)
 Joetsu University of Education
 Kagawa University
 Kagoshima University
 Kanazawa University
 Kitami Institute of Technology
 Kobe University
 Kochi University
 Kumamoto University
 Kyoto Institute of Technology
 Kyoto University of Education
 Kyushu Institute of Technology
 Mie University
 Miyagi University of Education
 Muroran Institute of Technology
 Nagaoka University of Technology
 Nagasaki University
 Nagoya Institute of Technology
 Nara Institute of Science and Technology
 Nara University of Education
 Nara Women's University
 Naruto University of Education
 National Graduate Institute for Policy Studies
 National Institute of Fitness and Sports in Kanoya
 Niigata University
 Obihiro University of Agriculture and Veterinary Medicine
 Ochanomizu University
 Oita University
 Okayama University
 Osaka Kyoiku University
 Otaru University of Commerce
 Saga University
 Saitama University
 Shiga University
 Shiga University of Medical Science
 Shimane University
 Shinshu University
 Shizuoka University
 Tokushima University
 Tokyo Gakugei University
 Tokyo University of Agriculture and Technology
 Tokyo University of Foreign Studies
 Tokyo University of Marine Science and Technology
 Tokyo University of the Arts
 Tottori University
 Toyohashi University of Technology
 Tsukuba University of Technology
 University of Electro-Communications
 University of Fukui
 University of Miyazaki
 University of the Ryukyus
 University of Toyama
 University of Yamanashi
 Utsunomiya University
 Wakayama University
 Yamagata University
 Yamaguchi University
 Yokohama National University

Although The Open University of Japan and Okinawa Institute of Science and Technology are founded by the national government's initiatives and heavily subsidised by the government, they are classified as private.

See also
Education in Japan
Going broke universities – Disappearing universities
Imperial Universities
List of public universities in Japan
List of universities in Japan
National University Corporation

References

External links
The Japan Association of National Universities
Ministry of Education, Culture, Sports, Science and Technology

 
National